Mestolobes semiochrea is a moth of the family Crambidae described by Arthur Gardiner Butler in 1882. It is endemic to the Hawaiian island of Oahu.

Adults have been taken while feeding on the blossoms of Metrosideros species.

External links

Crambinae
Moths described in 1882
Endemic moths of Hawaii